Eric Arthur Barber, FBA (8 October 1888; 24 May 1965) was an Oxford college head.

Barber was educated at Shrewsbury School and New College, Oxford. During World War I he served as an officer with the King's Shropshire Light Infantry.  A classicist, he was a Fellow of Merton College, Oxford, from 1910 to 1913. He was Fellow, Tutor and Lecturer in Classics at Exeter College, Oxford, from 1913 to 1943; and Rector of Exeter College, Oxford, from 1943 to 1956.

References

Classical scholars of the University of Oxford
People educated at Shrewsbury School
Fellows of Merton College, Oxford
Rectors of Exeter College, Oxford
Fellows of Exeter College, Oxford
1888 births
1965 deaths
Alumni of New College, Oxford
Royal Devon Yeomanry officers
King's Shropshire Light Infantry officers
British Army personnel of World War I